Tamei (Vidhan Sabha constituency) is one of the 60 Vidhan Sabha constituencies in the Indian state of Manipur.

It is part of Tamenglong district and is reserved for candidates belonging to the Scheduled Tribes.

Members of Assembly 
1967: D . Kipgen, Independent
1972: Pauheu, Independent
1974: Pauheu, Independent
1980: I. D. Dijuanang, Indian National Congress (I)
1984: I. D. Dijuanang, Independent
1990: I. D. Dijuanang, Indian National Congress (I)
1995: D.P. Panmei, Independent
2000: Z. Mangaibou, Manipur State Congress Party
2002: Z. Mangaibou, Indian National Congress (I)
2007: Awangbow Newmei, Independent
2012: Kikhonbou Newmai, Indian National Congress (I)

Election results

2017

See also
Manipur Legislative Assembly
List of constituencies of Manipur Legislative Assembly
 Tamenglong district

References

External link
 

Assembly constituencies of Manipur
Tamenglong district